Upper Harbour is a local government area in Auckland, in New Zealand's Auckland Region, governed by the Hibiscus and Bays Local Board and Auckland Council. It currently aligns with the council's Albany Ward.

Geography

The area includes Whenuapai, Herald Island, West Harbour and Hobsonville in the west, and Paremoremo, Greenhithe, North Harbour, Albany, Fairview Heights, Greenhithe, Rosedale, Northcross, Unsworth Heights, Windsor Park, Sunnynook, and Pinehill in the east.

The Pāremoremo Scenic Reserve is the largest bush reserve on the North Shore. It is ecological bridge between the Hauraki Gulf islands and the Waitakere Ranges.

References